Bateston is a community in the Canadian province of Nova Scotia, located in the Cape Breton Regional Municipality on Cape Breton Island. It is known for its flashing light at the center of town.

Organizations operating in Bateston include the Bateston Athletic Pensioners and Seniors Club and the Bateston Fire Hall.

References
 Bateston on Destination Nova Scotia

Communities in the Cape Breton Regional Municipality
General Service Areas in Nova Scotia